M. A. Ganapathy (born 1 March 1964) is an Indian Police Service Officer of the 1986 batch of Uttarakhand cadre, now serving as the Director General of the National Security Guard w.e.f. 18/03/2021. He has previously served as Director General of Bureau of Civil Aviation Security and Director General of Police, Uttarakhand.

Early life and education 

M. A. Ganapathy was born in Kodagu (Coorg) district, Karnataka. He completed his school education in Kodagu. He graduated in Economics from Madras Christian College, Chennai (1984) and did his Master's degree in International Studies from Jawahar Lal Nehru University, Delhi (1986). He also holds a Degree in Law from University of Delhi (2007).

Career in Indian Police Service

Uttar Pradesh 
M. A. Ganapathy was initially allotted Uttar Pradesh Cadre and served there between 1987 and 1999. During this period, inter-alia, he worked as Senior/Superintendent of Police in districts like Kanpur City, Meerut, Allahabad, Nainital, Hardoi, Sonebhadra etc. The policing challenges in these assignments were varied and included tackling communal issues, city policing, serious crimes investigation, anti-dacoity operations, naxal problem etc.

Central Bureau of Investigation 
M. A. Ganapathy served in the CBI as SP/DIG between 1999 and 2007. During this period, as SP he supervised the enquiry into allegations of Cricket match fixing (2000), which culminated in action against certain cricketers by the BCCI. M A Ganapathy features in a book on Cricket match fixing by sports journalist Ed Hawkins titled 'Bookie, Gambler, Fixer, Spy: A journey into the heart of crickets underworld' (Bloomsburg, 2012), where his role as investigator in the cricket match fixing enquiry of CBI in 2000 is discussed in detail. Subsequently, upon promotion, M A Ganapathy was DIG of Anti-Corruption-I, Delhi, which investigates corruption cases.

Uttarakhand 
M. A. Ganapathy was allocated Uttarakhand cadre after the creation of the new State in 2000. He served there in various capacities as IG Crime/Law & Order, IG Garhwal Range, IG Haridwar Mahakumbh-2010, etc. He was appointed as DGP of Uttarakhand in May, 2016 at the age of 53. During his tenure as DGP, he focused on rules based policing and also introduced many community policing models based on local needs.

Ministry of Home Affairs 
M. A. Ganapathy served as Joint Secretary, Left Wing Extremism and Joint Secretary, Internal Security-I, MHA, between 2011 and 2016. As JS, LWE, he supervised implementation of projects like fortified police stations, installation of telecom towers, up-gradation of special forces, etc. in LWE affected States. He also formulated the initial draft of the comprehensive policy framework of the Central Government's Counter LWE strategy (National Policy and Action Plan-2015). As Joint Secretary, Internal Security, he was instrumental in drafting the National Security Clearance Policy of MHA (2015). He also took part in various JWG deliberations on Counter Terrorism and Financial Action Task Force (FATF) plenary sessions.

Central Industrial Security Force 
M. A. Ganapathy served as Spl. DG/ADG, Airport Sector, CISF, between 2017 and 2020. During this period introduction of state of the art technology in aviation security became a focus area. Also, steps were initiated to downsize manpower in Airport Security through rationalization and use of technology. The professional competence of CISF personnel was also up-graded through training collaboration with global leaders in aviation security.

Bureau of Civil Aviation Security 
M. A. Ganapathy served as DG, BCAS between 2020 and 2021.

National Security Guard 
M. A. Ganapathy was appointed as Director General of the National Security Guard on 18 March 2021.

Training 
 National Security and Strategic Affairs, National Defence College, Delhi (2006)
 Oxford University Programme on 'Negotiations' (2012)
 Harvard University, Kennedy School Programme on 'Leadership in the 21st century:Chaos, Conflict and Courage (2013)

Awards/commendations 
Police Medal for Meritorious Services (2002). 

President's Police Medal for Distinguished Services (2010).

Articles and publications 
A virtuous process needed to stop the evil* (Article on Cricket Match Fixing)-Deccan Herald, 25 May 2013.

A tryst with wild places (A police officer ratees roaming the forests as his best non-professional reward)- THE HINDU magazine, 

29 January 2023.

See also

 Director General of the National Security Guard
 Jayanta Narayan Choudhury
 Ranjit Shekhar Mooshahary

References 

1964 births
Living people
Indian Police Service officers
People from Kodagu district
Madras Christian College alumni
Jawaharlal Nehru University alumni
Faculty of Law, University of Delhi alumni